Hugh McElvaney is an Irish politician and businessman. He is a member of Monaghan County Council, elected originally for Fine Gael but now an independent, representing the Ballybay-Clones Electoral Area since its establishment from the 2014 election onwards. He is involved with waste management firms used in several Irish jurisdictions, and valued at over €16 million per annum. McElvaney is currently under investigation by the Standards in Public Office Commission following the 2015 RTÉ broadcast of Standards in Public Office, which alleged that he was corrupt.

Electoral history
McElvaney stood as a candidate for Fine Gael in the Cavan-Monaghan at the November 1982 Irish general election; he finished bottom in a poll topped by the future Tánaiste John Wilson.

McElvaney instead established himself as a Fine Gael stalwart in Monaghan. He has four times been Mayor of Monaghan and has been elected to Monaghan County Council on nine occasions, as of (and including) the 2014 election.

He stood for Fine Gael at the 1999 Monaghan County Council election, topping the poll in the Clones Electoral Area. He again topped the poll for Fine Gael at the 2004 Monaghan County Council election, notably finishing ahead of party colleague Heather Humphreys, a future Member of Cabinet. Humphreys and Fine Gael party colleague McElvaney finished in reverse positions at the 2009 Monaghan County Council election, though this was sufficient for McElvaney's re-election. McElvaney was elected for Fine Gael in the new Ballybay-Clones Electoral Area at the 2014 Monaghan County Council election.

RTÉ Investigates programme
McElvaney was one of three politicians secretly filmed for Standards in Public Office, which aired on RTÉ One straight after the Nine O'Clock News on 8 December 2015. For the purposes of its programme, RTÉ established an imaginary company it named Vinst Opportunities, with imaginary investors searching for ways to set up wind farms without having to deal with any problems that might arise if the imaginary company and its imaginary investors sought planning permission. Discovering that he directed a consultancy company which was absent from his public declaration of financial interests, a declaration which also did not include a farm, houses and commercial property on 12 February 2015 (one day after McElvaney made requests for planning permission at two of these sites - one for a housing development and the other for a storage facility), RTÉ contacted McElvaney.

McElvaney met with the imaginary representative of the imaginary company, who secretly filmed him. McElvaney asked the imaginary company representative: "Are you going to pay me by the hour or the job?" As the imaginary representative arranged a meeting with other imaginary representatives, McElvaney was recorded saying: "And you will have plenty of sterling with you? You need to sweeten the man up. You know what I mean." When asked for a specific amount of money, McElvaney responded: "Ten grand would be a start." McElvaney went on to say: "I am the conduit between your investment company and [Monaghan] County Council. And I am also the conduit between you and the people where you intend building". McElvaney advised the imaginary representative that secrecy would be necessary: "The more that's in the bag, the keener I will be. Don't tell anybody else our terms and conditions".

McElvaney responded immediately before and after RTÉ's airing of its programme by claiming he knew it was a sting and that he was eager to play along. His fellow councillors voted to oust him at a meeting arranged especially to respond to the programme but McElvaney refused to leave. A parody of the affair - combining McElvaney's words ("Money. Sterling. Money. Sterling". "I want loads of money"), hand gestures and body movements with the "Macarena" song - quickly went viral. In April 2018, the Standards in Public Office Commission (SIPO) announced that McElvaney would face an ethics hearing that September as part of its response to the programme; he was the last of the three councillors called before the hearing. In March 2019, the Commission announced its results concerning the other two politicians featured on the programme.

Tax default
In March 2018, Revenue named McElvaney on its tax defaulter list after he under-declared a sum of €48,041.29 in taxes.

References

Year of birth missing (living people)
Living people
Fine Gael politicians
Irish businesspeople
Local councillors in County Monaghan
Mayors of places in the Republic of Ireland